West Quartzite Range is a mountain range, the western of two parallel quartzite ranges, situated at the east side of Houliston Glacier in the Concord Mountains, Antarctica. Named by the Northern Party of NZFMCAE, 1962–63, after the distinctive geological formation of the feature.

Mountain ranges of Victoria Land
Pennell Coast